Laosicheng is an archaeological site in Sicheng Village of Lingxi Town, Yongshun County, Hunan Province, China. It is one of the three Tusi Sites designated by the UNESCO as a World Heritage Site, On July 3, 2015. The site is the historic capital of Peng clan Tusi for six centuries in modern-day Yongshun, it was built in 1135 (Southern Song dynasty) and abandoned in 1724 (Qing dynasty). Its original name was Fushicheng or Fushi City.

Laosicheng site covers a total area of 25 square kilometers, its core zone has an area of more than 250,000 square meters, in an urban layout of road networks and drainage systems. The relics unearthed included the Hall of Patriarch, Patriarch Temple of the Peng clan, the tombs of Tusi chieftains, ancient streets, ancient city walls, memorial arches, bronze bells and stone horses. it is known as a sacred place of the Tujia  culture.

References 

Yongshun County
Major National Historical and Cultural Sites in Hunan
Castles in China
Archaeological sites in China